Sollie B. Norwood (born August 5, 1952) is an American politician who has served in the Mississippi State Senate from the 28th district since 2013.

References

1952 births
Living people
Democratic Party Mississippi state senators
Politicians from Jackson, Mississippi
African-American state legislators in Mississippi
21st-century American politicians
21st-century African-American politicians
20th-century African-American people